Hushpuckena is an unincorporated community located in Bolivar County, Mississippi, United States along U.S. Route 61. Hushpuckena is located on the former Yazoo and Mississippi Valley Railroad.

Hushpuckena was named after the Hushpuckena River.

A post office operated under the name Hushpuckena from 1885 to 1968.

Gallery

References

Unincorporated communities in Bolivar County, Mississippi
Unincorporated communities in Mississippi
Mississippi placenames of Native American origin